The Catholic Church in Angola is part of the worldwide Catholic Church, under the spiritual leadership of the Pope in Rome. As of 2020, approximately 53.85% of the population profess the Catholic faith, due largely to Angola's status as a former Portuguese colony.

There are 19 dioceses, including 5 archdioceses. All the bishops are members of the regional Episcopal Conference of Angola and São Tomé.

Archdiocese of Huambo
Diocese of Benguela
Diocese of Kwito-Bié
Archdiocese of Luanda
Diocese of Cabinda
Diocese of Caxito
Diocese of Mbanza Congo
Diocese of Sumbe
Diocese of Viana
Archdiocese of Lubango
Diocese of Menongue
Diocese of Ondjiva
Diocese of Namibe
Archdiocese of Malanje
Diocese of Ndalatando
Diocese of Uíje
Archdiocese of Saurímo
Diocese of Dundo
Diocese of Lwena

See also
Catholic Church by country

References

External links
Current site of Episcopal Conference of Angola and Sao Tome
Former site of Episcopal Conference of Angola and Sao Tome